Potomac State College is a public college in Keyser, West Virginia. It is part of the West Virginia University system. Potomac State College is located approximately 90 miles (140 km) east of West Virginia University's campus in Morgantown, West Virginia. 

The college, with an enrollment of 1193 in Fall 2020, offers associate of arts, associate of applied science, and Bachelor of Applied Science degrees along with the Regents bachelor's degree.  In 2018, Potomac State College began offering West Virginia University’s Bachelor of Science in Nursing program on the Keyser campus with the first cohort of students graduating in Spring 2021.

In addition to academic buildings, the campus includes six residence halls, a conference center, a performing arts center, a recreation center, a gymnasium and athletic fields. The college owns three farms totaling 800 plus acres, supporting the only agricultural program in the region.

History 

At the urging of Mineral County member of the West Virginia House of Delegates, Francis M. Reynolds, Potomac State College was created in 1901 as the Keyser Preparatory Branch of West Virginia University, by an act of the West Virginia Legislature.  

After receiving an appropriation of $20,000 from the legislature for the construction of buildings, Colonel Thomas Beall Davis, a local businessman, donated 16 acres of land as a site for the new school. That location, formerly Fort Fuller (also known as Fort Kelly), was a critical fortress in maintaining open roads leading to the South Branch and Shenandoah Valleys and in retaining Union control of the Baltimore and Ohio Railroad (B&O) during the American Civil War. 

Once construction was completed on the multi-purpose building that would house offices, classrooms, a library, recitation halls and a gymnasium, the College opened its doors to 80 students in Fall 1902 as the West Virginia Preparatory School. Lloyd F. Friend was appointed principal and teacher and was joined by four other teachers.

In spring 1917, fire broke out in the multi-purpose building destroying most of the structure. Operations were moved to Davis Hall, named in honor of Thomas B. Davis, which was completed in 1916.  

With appropriations from the WV Legislature, a new Administration Building was completed in 1919.  That same year, the college purchased 129 acres of land adjacent to its property for its agriculture program. 

After decades as a regional campus of West Virginia University, Potomac State College became an integrated division of the university on July 1, 2005.  Many non-academic services at Potomac State have now come under the control of its main campus.

Campus buildings 

Reynolds Hall, a residence hall completed in 1925, is named after WV Senator E. B. Reynolds, the son of Francis M. Reynolds. In addition to securing funds for a women’s residence hall and gymnasium, E. B. Reynolds was also instrumental in Potomac State becoming part of West Virginia University. Lough Gymnasium was completed in 1928 in honor of Coach Dana G. Lough. At the request of Joseph W. Stayman, who served as principal from 1912 to 1936, the WV Legislature renamed the institution the Potomac State School of West Virginia in 1935. 

Science Hall, completed in 1951, houses laboratories and classrooms for the sciences. By an act of the WV Legislature, the school was renamed Potomac State College in 1953. Memorial Hall, a residence hall completed in 1957, was named in memory of the 41 former Potomac State students who lost their lives during World War II.

Friend Hall, a residence hall completed in 1962, was named in honor of Lloyd L. Friend who served as the first principal of the West Virginia Preparatory School. Academy Hall, which houses classrooms, computer labs and offices, was completed in 1968.  It was so named to recognize the college's academic heritage. 

Golden Park, the college’s baseball field, was completed in 2002 and was named after the Golden Family, whose son, Bryan, was a catcher on the Catamount's baseball team. University Place, completed in 2007, houses students, offices, two dining facilities, study /social lounges, and a movie theater. The Indoor Riding Arena, completed in 2008, houses the College’s American Quarter Horse herd and is used as a classroom and for equine and livestock competitions. 

Catamount Place, which previously served as Potomac Valley Hospital, was totally renovated to become the college’s sixth residence hall, opening its doors to students in January 2013. 

The Recreation Center, located in the J. Edward Kelley Complex (named for Keyser, WV, native and Medal of Honor recipient J. Edward Kelley), opened its doors in January 2017.

College farms
The college has three farms totaling more than 800 acres.

Gustafson Farm sometimes referred to as the Upper Farm is named after former Professor Oscar Gustafson who worked at Potomac State from 1956 until his retirement in 1988. The farm is 368  acres, and serves as a mixed-use production farm and teaching lab. The farm houses the college’s goat operation.

Malone Farm, named after former Agriculture professor Kenneth M. Malone. It is the college’s beef farm.

Dermer Farm, named after the Dermer Family who once owned the farm. The farm is used for hay and field corn production.

Academics 
Serving residential and commuter students, the college offers 62 degrees and is accredited as part of West Virginia University by the Higher Learning Commission.

Athletics 
Potomac State College hosts 10 varsity teams that compete in the National Junior College Athletic Association (NJCAA) and in the NJCAA Region XX, including: baseball, softball, men’s and women’s basketball, men’s lacrosse, men’s and women’s soccer, women’s volleyball, and men’s and women’s cross country.

The baseball and men’s lacrosse teams compete on the NJCAA Division I level while the remainder of the programs compete on the NJCAA Division II level.

Their mascot is the Catamount, named for the mountain lions that once roamed the surrounding area.  

Esports made its debut at the college in 2019, competing in League of Legends, Rocket League, Call of Duty, Madden, Rainbow 6 Siege and Apex Legends. The Catamount Esports program posted a regular season record of 8-1 with the National Association of Collegiate Esports, winning two trophies in the Eastern Conference Athletic Conference Madden competition and representing West Virginia University in the Big XII segment of the Level Next National Championships.  

The Potomac State College Athletic Department also hosts a Cheer Squad focusing on competitive and sideline cheering.

Highlights 
 Baseball has competed in seven NJCAA World Series: 1993, 1994, 1995, 2004, 2005, 2006 and 2011; winning the National Championship at the 1995 JUCO World Series. Former Major League Baseball pitcher Dave Roberts was assistant baseball coach at Potomac State in the 1990s.
 Women’s softball has played in four NJCAA World Series: 2015, 2016, 2017 and 2018.
 Men’s basketball reached No. 1 National ranking during the 2018-2019 season. They competed in the 16-team NJCAA Division II National Championship Tournament in 2014 as well.
 Women’s basketball made trips to the National Championship Tournament in 2000 and 2007.
 Women’s Volleyball played in the National Championship Tournaments in 2016, 2017 and 2021.
 Men’s Lacrosse finished the 2019 season ranked 10th in the nation.

Student life 
The Office of Student Experience provides a wide range of activities, clubs, events and educational opportunities outside of the classroom. The college's setting in the Potomac Highlands of West Virginia offers nearby opportunities to hike, kayak, whitewater raft, fish, snow ski and snowboard.

Notable alumni 
 Henry Louis Gates, Jr., Alphonse Fletcher, Jr. University Professor and director of the Hutchins Center for African & African American Research at Harvard University
 Gene Guarilia, professional basketball player
 John Kruk, professional baseball player and analyst

See also 
 West Virginia University

References

External links 
Official website

 
Public universities and colleges in West Virginia
Education in Mineral County, West Virginia
West Virginia University
Universities and colleges of Cumberland, MD-WV-PA
Educational institutions established in 1901
Buildings and structures in Mineral County, West Virginia
1901 establishments in West Virginia
Two-year colleges in the United States
NJCAA athletics
Keyser, West Virginia